Future value is the value of an asset at a specific date. It measures the nominal future sum of money that a given sum of money is "worth" at a specified time in the future assuming a certain interest rate, or more generally, rate of return; it is the present value multiplied by the accumulation function.
The value does not include corrections for inflation or other factors that affect the true value of money in the future.  This is used in time value of money calculations.

Overview
Money value fluctuates over time: $100 today has a different value than $100 in five years. This is because one can invest $100 today in an interest-bearing bank account or any other investment, and that money will grow/shrink due to the rate of return. Also, if $100 today allows the purchase of an item, it is possible that $100 will not be enough to purchase the same item in five years, because of inflation (increase in purchase price).

An investor who has some money has two options: to spend it right now or to invest it. The financial compensation for saving it (and not spending it) is that the money value will accrue through the interests that he will receive from a borrower (the bank account on which he has the money deposited).

Therefore, to evaluate the real worthiness of an amount of money today after a given period of time, economic agents compound the amount of money at a given interest rate. Most actuarial calculations use the risk-free interest rate which corresponds the minimum guaranteed rate provided the bank's saving account, for example. If one wants to compare their change in purchasing power, then they should use the real interest rate (nominal interest rate minus inflation rate).

The operation of evaluating a present value into the future value is called capitalization (how much will $100 today be worth in 5 years?). The reverse operation which consists in evaluating the present value of a future amount of money is called a discounting (how much $100 that will be received in 5 years- at a lottery, for example -are worth today?).

It follows that if one has to choose between receiving $100 today and $100 in one year, the rational decision is to cash the $100 today. If the money is to be received in one year and assuming the savings account interest rate is 5%, the person has to be offered at least $105 in one year so that two options are equivalent (either receiving $100 today or receiving $105 in one year). This is because if you have cash of $100 today and deposit in your savings account, you will have $105 in one year.

Simple interest
To determine future value (FV) using simple interest (i.e., without compounding):

where PV is the present value or principal, t is the time in years (or a fraction of year), and r stands for the per annum interest rate. Simple interest is rarely used, as compounding is considered more meaningful . Indeed, the Future Value in this case grows linearly (it's a linear function of the initial investment): it doesn't take into account the fact that the interest earned might be compounded itself and produce further interest (which corresponds to an exponential growth of the initial investment -see below-).

Compound interest
To determine future value using compound interest:

where PV is the present value, t is the number of compounding periods  (not necessarily an integer), and i is the interest rate for that period. Thus the future value increases exponentially with time when i is positive. The growth rate is given by the period, and i, the interest rate for that period. Alternatively the growth rate is expressed by the interest per unit time based on continuous compounding. For example, the following all represent the same growth rate:
3 % per half year
6.09 % per year (effective annual rate, annual rate of return, the standard way of expressing the growth rate, for easy comparisons)

Also the growth rate may be expressed in a percentage per period (nominal rate), with another period as compounding basis; for the same growth rate we have:
6% per year with half a year as compounding basis

To convert an interest rate from one compounding basis to another compounding basis (between different periodic interest rates), the following formula applies:

where
i1 is the periodic interest rate with compounding frequency n1 and
i2 is the periodic interest rate with compounding frequency n2.

If the compounding frequency is annual, n2 will be 1, and to get the annual interest rate (which may be referred to as the effective interest rate, or the annual percentage rate), the formula can be simplified to:

where r is the annual rate, i the periodic rate, and n the number of compounding periods per year.

Problems become more complex as you account for more variables.  For example, when accounting for annuities (annual payments), there is no simple PV to plug into the equation. Either the PV must be calculated first, or a more complex annuity equation must be used. Another complication is when the interest rate is applied multiple times per period. For example, suppose the 10% interest rate in the earlier example is compounded twice a year (semi-annually).  Compounding means that each successive application of the interest rate applies to all of the previously accumulated amount, so instead of getting 0.05 each 6 months, one must figure out the true annual interest rate, which in this case would be 1.1025 (one would divide the 10% by two to get 5%, then apply it twice: 1.052.)  This 1.1025 represents the original amount 1.00 plus 0.05 in 6 months to make a total of 1.05, and get the same rate of interest on that 1.05 for the remaining 6 months of the year.  The second six-month period returns more than the first six months because the interest rate applies to the accumulated interest as well as the original amount.

This formula gives the future value (FV) of an ordinary annuity (assuming compound interest):

where r = interest rate; n = number of periods.  The simplest way to understand the above formula is to cognitively split the right side of the equation into two parts, the payment amount, and the ratio of compounding over basic interest.  The ratio of compounding is composed of the aforementioned effective interest rate over the basic (nominal) interest rate.  This provides a ratio that increases the payment amount in terms present value.

See also
Lifetime value
Present value
Time value of money

References

External links
calculate the different FV's with one's own values

Theory of value (economics)
Mathematical finance